Laurence Holder is an American playwright, poet, and director who focuses on the African-American experience. His plays often center historical African-American figures including Malcolm X, Elijah Muhammad, Thelonious Monk, Duke Ellington, Billie Holiday, and Zora Neale Hurston. He is a 1998–1999 Otto Rene Castillo award recipient for political theatre. Holder's work has been performed at the Henry Street Settlement New Federal Theatre, the Ford Theatre, the American Place Theatre, and more. His work has been reviewed by The New York Times and the Washington Post among others. In addition to being a playwright, Holder teaches English at John Jay College of Criminal Justice.

Education 
Holder attended the City College of New York from which he received a bachelor's degree in geology and creative writing.

Plays

When the Chickens Come Home to Roost
Performed at the New Federal Theatre and featured Denzel Washington as Malcolm X and Kirk Kirksey as Elijah Muhammad.

Zora Neale Hurston
Off-Broadway play about the early 20th century writer starring Elizabeth Van Dyke and Tim Johnson and directed by Wynn Handiman. Shown at the American Place Theatre on West 46th Street in Manhattan.

Their Eyes Were Watching God
Off-Broadway play adapted from Zora Neale Hurston's novel Their Eyes Were Watching God; directed by Marishka S. Phillips and starring Lauren Marissa Smith. Held at the WOW Café Theatre in New York.

Monk
Off-Broadway one-man show starring Rome Neal as Thelonious Monk performed at the Nuyorican Poets Café. Directed by Holder and Neal. Assistant director, Jennifer Cummings. Lighting by Neal. Executive producer, Miguel Algarín. Production stage manager and sound by Triple-5 (William J. Vila). Jechibea Adu-Peasah on set design. This play has been reviewed by The New York Amsterdam News.

MonknBud
A play depicting the relationship between the American jazz musicians Thelonious Monk and Bud Powell.

Awards 
 1998–1999 Otto Rene Castillo Award for Political Theatre
 Garland Anderson Award from the National Black Arts Festival
 New York Foundation Grant
 AUDELCO Best Writer Award for "M: The Mandela Saga"
 AUDELCO Award for drama Off and Off Off Broadway presented at CCNY's Aaron Davis Hall (1981) for "When the Chickens Come Home to Roost"

References

External links 
 https://theaterforthenewcity.net/?page_id=8
 https://www.wowcafe.org/event/their-eyes-were-watching-god-3/
 https://www.encyclopedia.com/education/news-wires-white-papers-and-books/holder-laurence-1939

African-American dramatists and playwrights
City College of New York alumni
Year of birth missing (living people)
Living people
21st-century African-American people